Daniela Ivanova is a Latvian weightlifter. She won the silver medal in the women's 76 kg event at the 2022 European Weightlifting Championships held in Tirana, Albania.

She also won the silver medal in her event at the 2022 Junior World Weightlifting Championships held in Heraklion, Greece. She competed in the women's 76kg event at the 2022 World Weightlifting Championships held in Bogotá, Colombia.

References

External links 
 

Living people
Year of birth missing (living people)
Place of birth missing (living people)
Latvian female weightlifters
European Weightlifting Championships medalists
21st-century Latvian women